George Pieniazek is a former physical education teacher at St Thomas à Becket school in Wakefield, and professional rugby league footballer who played in the 1980s, and coached in the 1980s.

Playing career

Club career
George Pieniazek made his début for Wakefield Trinity in April 1982. He also played for Bramley in the 1980–81 season.

Coaching career

Club career
George Pieniazek was the coach of Batley from November 1984 to November 1985.

References

External links
A Featherstone Rovers Blog: George Pieniazek
Domesday reloaded - Batley R.L.Club at bbc.co.uk
Photograph at wakefieldmuseumcollections.org.uk
Photograph "George Pieniazek and his aides Mr (Ray?) Handscombe and Peter Smith"

Living people
Batley Bulldogs coaches
Bramley RLFC players
English people of Polish descent
English rugby league players
Schoolteachers from Yorkshire
Featherstone Rovers coaches
Place of birth missing (living people)
Rugby league coaches
Rugby league players from Yorkshire
Rugby league wingers
Wakefield Trinity players
Year of birth missing (living people)